Clinger may refer to:

People
Charles Clinger (born 1976), American high jumper
David Clinger (born 1977), American road racing cyclist 
Jeanette Clinger, American singer/vocalist
William Clinger (1929–2021), American attorney and Republican politician
William Clinger (computer scientist), Associate Professor in the College of Computer and Information Science at Northeastern University

Other uses
Clinger (film), a 2015 American comedy-horror film
, a logistics support vessel in the United States Army

See also

Klinger (disambiguation)
Cling (disambiguation)
Clinge, a town in the Dutch province of Zeeland
Clinger–Booth House, an 1894 house in Orem, Utah, U.S.
Clinger–Cohen Act, formally the Information Technology Management Reform Act of 1996 (ITMRA)